Zlatko Zečević (born 10 August 1983) is a Serbian football goalkeeper.

References

External links
 
 Zlatko Zečević stats at utakmica.rs 
 
 

1983 births
Living people
Sportspeople from Kraljevo
Association football goalkeepers
Serbian footballers
OFK Beograd players
FK ČSK Čelarevo players
FK Mačva Šabac players
FK Voždovac players
FK Sevojno players
FK Banat Zrenjanin players
FK Jagodina players
FK Jedinstvo Užice players
FK Novi Pazar players
FK Mladost Lučani players
Serbian First League players
Serbian SuperLiga players
Cypriot First Division players
Serbian expatriate footballers
Expatriate footballers in Cyprus
Expatriate footballers in Albania
Kategoria Superiore players
KS Shkumbini Peqin players
Expatriate footballers in North Macedonia
FK Rabotnički players